Henry "Harry" J. Mandy (June 2, 1840 – August 14, 1904) was a soldier in the United States Army and a Medal of Honor recipient for his role in the American Civil War.

Mandy enlisted in the Army from New York City in September 1862, and was assigned to the 4th New York Cavalry. Following his MOH action, he was commissioned as an officer. He transferred to the 9th New York Cavalry in February 1865, and mustered out with his regiment in July 1865.

He is buried in Hampton National Cemetery, Hampton, Virginia. His grave can be found in the Pheobus Section B-8709.

Medal of Honor citation
Rank and organization: First Sergeant, Company B, 4th New York Cavalry. Place and date: At Front Royal, Va., August 15, 1864. Entered service at: New York, N.Y. Birth: England. Date of issue: August 26, 1864.

Citation:

Capture of flag of 3d Virginia Infantry (C.S.A.).

See also

 List of Medal of Honor recipients
 List of American Civil War Medal of Honor recipients: M–P

Notes

References

This article includes text in the public domain from the U.S. Government.
 
 

Burials in Virginia
English emigrants to the United States
English-born Medal of Honor recipients
1840 births
1904 deaths
United States Army Medal of Honor recipients
United States Army soldiers
American Civil War recipients of the Medal of Honor